Pegangsaan is an administrative village in the Menteng district of Indonesia. It has a postal code of 10320. This administrative village is also known as the location of the house where the Proclamation of Indonesian Independence was read.

See also 
 Menteng
 List of administrative villages of Jakarta

Administrative villages in Jakarta